The House (Chinese: 楼) is a 2013 Chinese thriller film directed by Yuan Li. It is about a web-novelist's experiences in a house that is said to be haunted.

Cast
 Ruby Lin
 Patrick Tam
 Victor Chen
 Na Wei
 Cheung Tat-ming
 Miao Haojun
 Bai Liuxi

References

2013 horror thriller films
2013 films
Chinese horror thriller films